SIG plc is a British-based international supplier of insulation, roofing, commercial interiors and specialist construction products. It is listed on the London Stock Exchange.

History
The company was founded by Ernest Adsetts in 1957 Sheffield as Sheffield Insulations Limited. His son Norman Adsetts joined the firm in 1966, becoming managing director in 1970, and then chairman in 1985. The company was first listed on the London Stock Exchange in 1989, when it became Sheffield Insulations Group plc. The company expanded rapidly in the start of the 1990s, acquiring Ceilings Distribution Ltd, a supplier in the United Kingdom of ceilings products, in 1990, Freeman Group, a large British insulation distributor, and Isokauf in Germany in 1994 and Komfort Systems, a supplier of partition systems for offices, in 1995.

The company was renamed SIG plc in 1995. Norman Adsetts retired the following year. Acquisitions in the end of the 1990s included WKT and Golinski of Germany in 1996, and Asphaltic, a major roofing supplier in the United Kingdom, CP Supplies and Branton Industries and Distribution International in the United States in 1997. In 2000, the company bought Nouwens Group in the Netherlands, and in 2001, it bought Capco, suppliers of interiors, roofing and insulation in the United Kingdom and Ireland. This was followed in 2002 by the acquisition of AM Proos and Clydesdale Roofing Supplies. In 2002, David Williams was appointed Chief Executive.

In 2004, the company bought Orion Trent Insulation, another distributor for the United Kingdom, with Leaderflush Shapland (formerly LS Group), a manufacturer of door sets for hospitals following in 2005. It bought Wodan and WIG in Poland, and exited the United States in 2006. The acquisition of Lariviere came in 2007, allowing the company to enter the French roofing market.

In 2007, General Fixings, based in Bristol, was acquired. Also in 2007, SIG moved into the refractory business, by purchasing MacGregor and Moir, one of the United Kingdom and Europe's leading specialists of high temperature insulation and refractory solutions. In 2008 it bought Air Trade Centre International B.V., a Dutch air conditioning business.

In 2008, David Williams retired, with Chris Davies taking his place as Chief Executive. In further management changes, Stuart Mitchell was appointed as CEO in March 2013, Meinie Oldersma took over the role in March 2017 and Steve Francis became CEO in April 2020.

Operations
The company serves a wide range of markets across the building, construction, off site manufacturing and process sectors, from premises throughout Europe and the Middle East.

References

External links
Official site

Building materials companies of the United Kingdom
Business services companies established in 1956
Companies listed on the London Stock Exchange
Manufacturing companies based in Sheffield
1956 establishments in England